Harmony Airways was an airline headquartered in Richmond, British Columbia, Canada, a suburb of Vancouver. It operated holiday flights from Canada to Mexico, Hawaii and Las Vegas, Nevada. Its main base was Vancouver International Airport.

History 
The airline was officially announced as HMY Airways (an abbreviation for Harmony) by David Ting Kwok Ho in February 2002. After acquiring two Boeing 757-200 jetliners in September and November 2002, the airline's inaugural flight flew from Vancouver in November 2002. The airline was wholly owned by David Ting Kwok Ho. 

Throughout the mid 2000s, the airline steadily expanded, first within Canada, but it soon expanded to Hawaii and to many destinations in southern USA. Future plans included expanding into China, but those plans were never realized. The airline was renamed Harmony Airways in May 2004. 

Harmony's telephone reservations were contracted to a dedicated call centre team at Vantis Corporation in Calgary, Alberta (later briefly renamed Vantis-TravelCLICK before closing down Calgary operations in October 2006). Vantis (previously known as VIP) was a third-party call centre based in Calgary before being acquired by TravelCLICK in October 2005, then having operations moved to Jamaica in October 2006. Harmony's call centre contract with Vantis-TravelCLICK ended after Harmony ceased operations in 2007.

From June 2006 to October 2006, Harmony Airways leased a Bombardier CRJ-100 to operate on their Vancouver - Calgary route. The aircraft was configured in a single-class 50-seat configuration, and was painted in a hybrid, United Express - Harmony Airways livery.

On March 27, 2007, Harmony Airways announced that it had issued layoff notices to all staff, and that it was ending scheduled flight service on April 9, 2007, due to increasing fuel costs and having a hard time attracting full-service passengers amid low-cost competition, such as WestJet. Harmony also had a hard time attracting profitable business travelers, due to a lack of a frequent flier program and lacking services to popular business destinations.

Destinations 
As of October 2006, Harmony Airways had services to the following destinations:

 Palm Springs, California
 Hilo, Hawaii
 Honolulu, Hawaii
 Maui, Hawaii
 Toronto, Ontario
 Calgary, Alberta
 Oakland, California
 New York, New York
 Vancouver, British Columbia
 Abbotsford, British Columbia
 Las Vegas, Nevada
 Victoria, British Columbia (Seasonal)
 Kelowna, British Columbia (Seasonal)
 Edmonton, Alberta (Seasonal)

Fleet 

The Harmony Airways fleet consisted of Boeing 757-200 aircraft. For a short period of time in 2006, Harmony Airways operated a Bombardier CRJ-100 aircraft on its Vancouver - Calgary route.

As of March 2007  the Harmony Airways fleet included four Boeing 757-200 aircraft. On March 22, 2007, the National Post reported that Harmony Airways would reduce its fleet to three 757s. In the summer of 2007, British engine manufacturer Rolls-Royce purchased two of Harmony's 757s in order to harvest the plane's RB211-535 engines to support other customers' engine needs. Rolls-Royce then sold the remaining aircraft hulls to an American salvage company.

Services
Harmony Airways offered two classes of service on their Boeing 757-200 aircraft (the Bombardier CRJ-100 was single-class): Business and Economy class. Both classes were advertised as being full-service compared to WestJet and other low-cost alternatives.

Business Class
Available on Boeing 757-200 aircraft, Business Class was Harmony's flagship product. Business class was sometimes marketed as harmonyone. Seats had a pitch of 52 inches, and a width of 22 inches.  Passengers were given personal AVOD (Audio Video On Demand) systems to use during the flight. Amenity kits were also provided.

Economy Class
Harmony Airways promoted their economy class as higher quality than other airlines, stating "We really shouldn't even use the word economy". Seats had a pitch of 32 inches. Harmony gave out free headphones in Economy class that passengers could keep, to use with the Inflight entertainment. Complimentary hot meals were served on longer routes.

See also 
 List of defunct airlines of Canada

References

External links 

 Harmony Airways (Archive)
 Harmony Vacations (Archive)

Airlines established in 2002
Transport in Richmond, British Columbia
Defunct airlines of Canada
Airlines disestablished in 2007
2002 establishments in British Columbia
2007 disestablishments in British Columbia